HMS Forfar (F30) was a British ocean liner that was commissioned into the Royal Navy as an armed merchant cruiser in 1939 and sunk by enemy action in 1940. She was launched in Scotland in 1920 as a transatlantic liner for the Canadian Pacific Steamship Company as Montrose. She was one of three sister ships.

Building and registration
Canadian Pacific ordered a set of three ships from shipyards on the River Clyde. John Brown & Company in Clydebank built Montcalm and Montclare. The Fairfield Shipbuilding and Engineering Company in Govan built Montrose as yard number 529. Lady Raeburn, wife of the Director-General of the UK Ministry of Shipping, launched Montrose on 14 December 1920. The ship was completed in March 1922.

She had twin screws, each driven by high- and low-pressure steam turbines via single reduction gearing.

The Canadian Pacific Railway Company owned the ship, but the Canadian Pacific Steamship Company was her operator. CP registered her at Liverpool in England. Her United Kingdom official number was 145919 and her code letters were KLTJ.

Civilian service
On 7 August 1925 Montrose ran aground in the Saint Lawrence River in Canada. She was refloated on 10 August 1925 and dry docked for repairs to her rudder and port-side propeller.

On 31 July 1928 Montrose collided with the British cargo ship Rose Castle in the Saint Lawrence River, Quebec, Canada. Rose Castle beached herself to avoid sinking, and was refloated on 3 August 1928.

Montrose suffered from excessive fuel consumption. To address this, by 1930 by Harland & Wolff in Belfast had replaced her four turbines and double-reduction gearing with a new set of six turbines and single-reduction gearing. This also marginally increased her power output. Also by 1930, she had the call sign GFTK.

HMS Forfar
The Admiralty requisitioned Montrose on 4 September 1939. Her conversion into an armed merchant cruiser was completed on 6 November 1939. She was given the pennant number F30.

On 2 December 1940 Forfar was on the Northern Patrol. She had just left eastbound Convoy HX 90 and was on her way to join westbound Convoy OB 251. At 05:46 hrs she was about 500 nautical miles west of Ireland when the  torpedoed her. The U-boat hit her with further torpedoes at 06:39, 06:43, 06:50 and 06:57 hours. Forfar sank quickly after the fifth torpedo hit her.

36 officers and 136 men were killed, including her commanding officer, Norman Arthur Cyril Hardy. The Royal Canadian Navy destroyer , British destroyer , and British cargo steamship Dunsley rescued 21 survivors and landed them at Oban in Scotland.

References

Bibliography

Further reading
 

1920 ships
World War II Auxiliary cruisers of the Royal Navy
Maritime incidents in 1925
Maritime incidents in 1928
Maritime incidents in December 1940
Ocean liners of the United Kingdom
Ships built on the River Clyde
Ships sunk by German submarines in World War II
Steamships of the United Kingdom
World War II cruisers of the United Kingdom
World War II shipwrecks in the Atlantic Ocean